Clarence B. Robinson (1911–2002) was an educator and Tennessee state representative (1974–1992) from District 28, and was a founder of the Black Caucus in the Tennessee General Assembly. The C.B. Robinson Bridge (1981) over the Tennessee River in Chattanooga was named after him.

Robinson was succeeded as District 28 Representative in the state legislature by Tommie Brown.

References

1911 births
2002 deaths
African-American state legislators in Tennessee
20th-century American politicians
20th-century African-American politicians
21st-century African-American people